Guillermo Maldonado (born 1965 or 1966) is a Honduran-American evangelical Christian, pastor, televangelist, and author. He is the co-founder and senior pastor of El Rey Jesús, a Nondenominational Christian megachurch located in Miami, Florida.

Personal life 
Maldonado was born in Honduras and emigrated to the United States in the 1990s. In an interview conducted by Publishers Weekly, Maldonado claimed that Jesus Christ appeared before him during intense prayer and audibly spoke to him saying, "I have called you to bring my supernatural power to this generation." He spent several years traveling across Central and South America, preaching with his ex-wife Ana before settling in Miami. She is originally from Colombia. They have two children, Bryan and Ronald, who are both involved in their parents' ministry.

Maldonado has a master's degree in practical theology from Oral Roberts University and a doctorate in divinity from Vision International University, an unaccredited distance learning institution based in Ramona, California.  

In September 2020, Ana Maldonado announced she was divorcing her husband, citing emotional and verbal abuse and financial impropriety, and started a new ministry independent of El Rey.

Ministry 
Maldonado is the co-founder and senior pastor of El Rey Jesús (English: King Jesus Ministry) in Miami, Florida. Maldonado co-founded the church with his wife Ana Maldonado in 1996. It started with twelve members operating out of the Maldonados' living room, and currently hosts 15,000 and 20,000 individuals per week, making it the largest Hispanic church in the United States. The church has several affiliate locations throughout the state of Florida, with additional satellite locations in Georgia and New York. In 2010, the church also opened an orphanage, Casa Hogar, in Honduras.

Maldonado hosts the televangelist program The Supernatural Now, which is aired on televangelist networks TBN, Daystar, and The Church Channel. As of May 22, 2013, his ministry, along with other of his affiliated daughter churches, have a combined membership of 20,000 congregants.

He has written over 50 books and manuals with many of them translated into Spanish, English, Portuguese, Italian, and French. He speaks Spanish and English, commonly code switching during sermons.

Ideology 
Maldonado teaches that Christian believers need to use the power of God to demonstrate that God is active in the world today just as he was during the time of the primitive church. He believes that without the supernatural power of God, it is impossible to truly know God and receive his blessings of healing, wealth, deliverance, among others in our life. His teachings also focus on establishing what he calls the Kingdom of God. He explains that the Kingdom of God is not a physical place, but a network of thoughts, lifestyle, principles, laws and fundamentals that govern the entire universe.

Controversially, Maldonado uses the title "Apostle", and refers to wife Ana as "Prophetess".

Political activity 
Maldonado is closely associated with Republican Party activities in the state of Florida. He hosted several Republican politicians, including President Donald Trump and Congressman Carlos A. Giménez. Maldonado has also claimed Trump's presidency was divinely-inspired, and called him "the presence of the living God". The church had previously hosted Republican candidates Bill McCollum and Rick Scott during the 2010 Florida gubernatorial election.

Maldonado led the opening prayer of the US House of Representatives October 14, 2009, and October 10, 2013. He was invited to the White House to witness the signing of an executive order promoting free speech and religious liberty.

Maldonado participated in the inauguration of Honduran President Porfirio Lobo Sosa in 2010.

Controversy

Coronavirus pandemic response 

Disregarding the coronavirus pandemic, Maldonado urged his congregants to show up for worship services in person. "Do you believe God would bring his people to his house to be contagious with the virus? Of course not," he said. He added, "If we die, we die for Christ. If we live, we live for Christ, so what do you lose?"

Maldonado has discouraged taking the vaccine against Covid-19: "Do not [take] the vaccine. Believe in the blood of Jesus. Believe in divine immunity."

Finances 
In a financial affidavit attached to her divorce filing, Ana Maldonado claimed that her husband owned property in Miami-Dade, Sunny Isles Beach, Opa-locka, Hialeah, and The Bahamas; luxury vehicles including a 2020 model Mercedes-Benz, a Lexus LX, and a Dassault Falcon 50 jet registered under the church's name. She further claimed that he had violated "Inurement Prohibition", an IRS rule which forbids key employees at 501(c)(3) organizations from profiting from a charity, and had hidden assets in Italy, Honduras, and Colombia valued at $120 million. Maldonado's lawyers and El Rey denied the allegations.

Bibliography

Awards 
Maldonado won the Spanish Evangelical Press Association (SEPA) award for the best original books in Spanish which are;

References

External links
Guillermo Maldonado official website
King Jesus Ministry official website

Living people
American Charismatics
American Pentecostal pastors
American television evangelists
American Christian writers
Hispanic and Latino American writers
Honduran emigrants to the United States
Year of birth missing (living people)
Honduran Pentecostal pastors